Koyukuk is a city in Yukon-Koyukuk Census Area, Alaska, United States.  At the 2010 census the population was 96, down from 101 in 2000.

, Koyukuk is one of a number of Alaskan communities threatened by erosion.

History
The Koyukon Athabascans had seasonal camps and moved when the wild game migrated. There were 12 summer fish camps located on the Yukon River between the Koyukuk River and the Nowitna River. Trading between the Koyukon and Inupiat of the Kobuk River area has occurred before the arrival of Europeans.

After the Alaska Purchase, a United States military telegraph line was constructed along the north side of the Yukon River and Koyukuk became the site of a telegraph station. A trading post opened around 1880, just before the gold rush of 1884–85. Steamboats on the Yukon, which supplied gold prospectors ran before and after 1900 with 46 boats in operation on the river in the peak year of 1900. A measles epidemic and food shortages during 1900 reduced the population of the area by one-third.

The first school in Koyukuk was constructed in 1939. After the school was built, families began to live at Koyukuk year-round.

Koyukuk was used as an Iditarod checkpoint in 2015 when the race was rerouted from Fairbanks.

Geography

Koyukuk is located on the Yukon River near the mouth of the Koyukuk River. It is adjacent to the Koyukuk National Wildlife Refuge and the Innoko National Wildlife Refuge.

Demographics

Koyukuk first appeared on the 1880 U.S. Census as the "Koyukuk Settlements", a Tinneh village. In 1890, it returned as "Koyukuk River Settlements." It did not appear again until 1910, then as Koyukuk. It formally incorporated in 1973.

As of the census of 2000, there were 101 people, 39 households, and 24 families residing in the city. The population density was 16.2 people per square mile (6.2/km2). There were 55 housing units at an average density of 8.8 per square mile (3.4/km2). The racial makeup of the city was 8.91% White and 91.09% Native American.

There were 39 households, out of which 41.0% had children under the age of 18 living with them, 30.8% were married couples living together, 20.5% had a female householder with no husband present, and 35.9% were non-families. 35.9% of all households were made up of individuals, and 5.1% had someone living alone who was 65 years of age or older. The average household size was 2.59 and the average family size was 3.32.

In the city, the population was spread out, with 34.7% under the age of 18, 8.9% from 18 to 24, 36.6% from 25 to 44, 12.9% from 45 to 64, and 6.9% who were 65 years of age or older. The median age was 30 years. For every 100 females, there were 98.0 males. For every 100 females age 18 and over, there were 144.4 males.

The median income for a household in the city was $19,375, and the median income for a family was $31,250. Males had a median income of $30,000 versus $0 for females. The per capita income for the city was $11,341. There were 20.8% of families and 35.1% of the population living below the poverty line, including 53.8% of under eighteens and 33.3% of those over 64.

Education
The Yukon–Koyukuk School District operates the Ella B. Vernetti School in Koyukuk.

Notable people
George Attla (1933–2015), champion sprint dog musher, was born in Koyukuk

References

Cities in Alaska
Cities in Yukon–Koyukuk Census Area, Alaska
Yukon River